Ingrid Margareta Gustavsson (born 10 March 1950) is a Swedish swimmer who won a silver medal in the  freestyle relay at the 1966 European Aquatics Championships. She also competed in the same event at the 1968 Summer Olympics, but the Swedish team was eliminated in the preliminaries.

References

1950 births
Swimmers at the 1968 Summer Olympics
Swedish female freestyle swimmers
Olympic swimmers of Sweden
Living people
European Aquatics Championships medalists in swimming
People from Luleå
Sportspeople from Norrbotten County